Rish Shah (born 17 December 1997) is an English actor. He was named a 2021 Brit to Watch by Variety. He had his breakout role entering the Marvel Cinematic Universe as the super-powered teenager Kamran in Ms. Marvel and also stars as Russ in Do Revenge (2022). He also appears in Riz Ahmed's Oscar winning short film The Long Goodbye (2020).

Early life
Rish Shah was born and raised in Enfield, North London. His parents are from Mumbai and Vadodara. He attended Grange Park Primary School and then Haberdashers' Boys' School. He graduated with a Bachelor of Arts in English and Linguistics from King's College London.

Career
In 2017, Shah appeared in the Merdel Theatre Company production of The Plains of Delight at Clapham Fringe Festival and the Fullscreen web series PrankMe by Hazel Hayes. In 2019, he made his television debut with guest appearances in Russell T Davies' Years and Years and the medical soap opera Doctors, both on BBC One. He also had stage roles in You're Dead, Mate at the Nutshell in Winchester and Torch Song Trilogy at the Turbine Theatre in London.

Shah appeared in Riz Ahmed's 2020 Oscar winning short film The Long Goodbye as Ahmed's younger brother. Shah took over the role of Kirin Kotecha in the ITV soap opera Emmerdale from Adam Fielding for the character's return in 2020.

Shah made his feature film debut in 2021 as Ravi in the Netflix film To All the Boys: Always and Forever and Varun Dutta in the romantic comedy film India Sweets and Spices opposite Sophia Ali. 

The following year he joined the Marvel Cinematic Universe and made his debut as superpowered teen Kamran in the Disney+ series Ms. Marvel.  He went on to play Russ in the Netflix comedy film Do Revenge. He is set to star in the Netflix limited thriller series Damage and Amazon film Sitting in Bars with Cake.

Filmography

Film

Television

Web

Stage

References

External links
 
 Rish Shah at Conway van Gelder Grant

Living people
1997 births
Alumni of King's College London
British male actors of Indian descent
English people of Gujarati descent
Male actors from London
National Youth Theatre members
People from the London Borough of Enfield